Monika Malik (born 5 November 1993) is an Indian field hockey player who represented India in the 2014 Asian Games and was part of the bronze-medal winning squad. She is currently employed with the Indian Railways.

See also
List of Indian sportswomen

References

External links

Monika Malik at Hockey India

1993 births
Living people
Indian female field hockey players
21st-century Indian women
21st-century Indian people
Asian Games medalists in field hockey
Asian Games silver medalists for India
Asian Games bronze medalists for India
Female field hockey defenders
Field hockey players at the 2014 Asian Games
Field hockey players at the 2016 Summer Olympics
Field hockey players at the 2020 Summer Olympics
Field hockey players at the 2018 Asian Games
Field hockey players from Haryana
Medalists at the 2014 Asian Games
Medalists at the 2018 Asian Games
Olympic field hockey players of India
Sportswomen from Haryana
Field hockey players at the 2018 Commonwealth Games
Field hockey players at the 2022 Commonwealth Games
Commonwealth Games bronze medallists for India
Commonwealth Games medallists in field hockey
Recipients of the Arjuna Award
Medallists at the 2022 Commonwealth Games